Strader is a surname. Notable people with the surname include:

Dave Strader (1955–2017), American sports announcer
Park M. Strader (born 1945), American politician
Peter W. Strader (1818–1881), American politician
Red Strader (1902–1956), American football player and coach

See also
Strader, California, in Kern County
Strader v. Graham, United States Supreme Court case